Alli Darbar is a 1978 Indian Tamil-language film directed by K. M. Balakrishnan, and produced by Aiyaa Creations. The film stars Vijayakumar and Manjula. It was released on 1 September 1978.

Plot 

Vijay, a youth, goes searching for a gang of women criminals, to stop their terrorising the people and to earn the police-sponsored . Vijay and his two friends, with help of some pet animals, thwart some of the robbery attempts. Alli, one of the chief gangsters, decides to capture Vijay but falls in love with him.

Cast 
 Vijayakumar as Vijay
 Manjula as Alli
 Kavitha as Malliga
 Bhavani
 Abarna
 Jayamalini
 M. N. Nambiar

Soundtrack 
The music of the film was composed by Shankar–Ganesh.

Release 
Alli Darbar was released on 1 September 1978.

Notes

References

External links 
 

1978 films
1970s Tamil-language films
Films scored by Shankar–Ganesh